This is a list of elementary schools in Saitama Prefecture.

National

Municipal

Saitama City

 Chūō-ku

 Kami Ochiai (上落合小学校)
 Oto (大戸小学校)
 Shimo Ochiai (下落合小学校)
 Suzuya (鈴谷小学校)
 Yono Hachiman (与野八幡小学校)
 Yono Honmachi (与野本町小学校)
 Yono Minami (与野南小学校)
 Yono Seihoku (与野西北小学校)

 Iwatsuki-ku

 Higashi Iwatsuki (東岩槻小学校)
 Iwatsuki (岩槻小学校)
 Jionji (慈恩寺小学校)
 Jouhoku (城北小学校)
 Jounan (城南小学校)
 Kamisato (上里小学校)
 Kashiwazaki (柏崎小学校)
 Kawadoori (川通小学校)
 Kawai (河合小学校)
 Niiwa (新和小学校)
 Nishihara (西原小学校)
 Ota (太田小学校)
 Tokuriki (徳力小学校)
 Wado (和土小学校)

 Kita-ku

 Higashi Onari (東大成小学校)
 Miyahara (宮原小学校)
 Nisshin (日進小学校)
 Nisshin Kita (日進北小学校)
 Omiya Bessho (大宮別所小学校)
 Osato (大砂土小学校)
 Taihei (泰平小学校)
 Tsubasa (つばさ小学校)
 Uetake (植竹小学校)

 Midori-ku

 Daimon (大門小学校)
 Harayama (原山小学校)
 Mimuro (三室小学校)
 Misono (美園小学校)
 Misono Kita (美園北小学校)
 Nakao (中尾小学校)
 Noda (野田小学校)
 Omagi (尾間木小学校)
 Omaki (大牧小学校)
 Saido (道祖土小学校)
 Shibahara (芝原小学校)

 Minami-ku

 Buzo (文蔵小学校)
 Minami Urawa (南浦和小学校)
 Mukai (向小学校)
 Nishi Urawa (西浦和小学校)
 Numakage (沼影小学校)
 Oyaba (大谷場小学校)
 Oyaba Higashi (大谷場東小学校)
 Oyaguchi (大谷口小学校)
 Tsuji (辻小学校)
 Tsuji Minami (辻南小学校)
 Urawa Bessho (浦和別所小学校)
 Urawa Osato (浦和大里小学校)
 Yada (谷田小学校)
 Zenmae (善前小学校)

 Minuma-ku

 Ebinuma (海老沼小学校)
 Haruno (春野小学校)
 Haruoka (春岡小学校)
 Hasunuma (蓮沼小学校)
 Higashi Miyashita (東宮下小学校)
 Katayanagi (片柳小学校)
 Minuma (見沼小学校)
 Nanasato (七里小学校)
 Osato Higashi (大砂土東小学校)
 Oya (大谷小学校)
 Shima (島小学校)

 Nishi-ku

 Mamiya Higashi (馬宮東小学校)
 Mamiyanishi (馬宮西小学校)
 Miyamae (宮前小学校)
 Omiya Nishi (大宮西小学校)
 Sakae (栄小学校)
 Sashiogi (指扇小学校)
 Sashiogi Kita (指扇北小学校)
 Uemizu (植水小学校)

 Omiya-ku

 Kamiko (上小小学校)
 Mihashi (三橋小学校)
 Omiya (大宮小学校)
 Omiya Higashi (立大宮東小学校)
 Omiya Kita (大宮北小学校)
 Omiya Minami (大宮南小学校)
 Onari (大成小学校)
 Sakuragi (桜木小学校)
 Shibakawa (芝川小学校)

 Sakura-ku

 Jinde (神田小学校)
 Nakajima (中島小学校)
 Okubo (大久保小学校)
 Okubo Higashi (大久保東小学校)
 Sakawa (栄和小学校)
 Shibiraki (新開小学校)
 Tajima (田島小学校)
 Tsuchiai (土合小学校)

 Urawa-ku

 Daito (大東小学校)
 Harigaya (針ヶ谷小学校)
 Kami Kizaki (上木崎小学校)
 Kishicho (岸町小学校)
 Kita Urawa (北浦和小学校)
 Kizaki (木崎小学校)
 Motobuto (本太小学校)
 Nakacho (仲町小学校)
 Nakamoto (仲本小学校)
 Takasogo (高砂小学校)
 Tokiwa (常盤小学校)
 Tokiwa Kita (常盤北小学校)

Other municipalities

Private
 Saitama Korean Elementary and Middle School (埼玉朝鮮初中級学校). This school was previously in the City of Ōmiya.

See also
 List of junior high schools in Saitama Prefecture

References

Schools in Saitama Prefecture
Saitama Prefecture